

P

Pa

Pe

Pi

Po

Pu

Q

R

Ra

Re

Ri

Ro

Ru

S

Sa

Sc

Se

Sh

Si

So

Sp

St

Su

References

External links
Schlumberger Oilfield Glossary

Underwater diving terminology
Underwater diving
Wikipedia glossaries using description lists